Penda Mbow, born in 1955, is a historian, an activist, and a Senegalese politician. Minister of Culture of Senegal for several months in 2001, she is a professor at Université Cheikh Anta Diop in Dakar and president of Mouvement citoyen (Citizens' Movement).

Biography
Penda Mbow was born in April 1955.

In 1986 she obtained a doctorate in Medieval History at Université de Provence in France, with a thesis titled L'aristocratie militaire mameluke d'après le cadastre d'Ibn al-Ji'an : éléments de comparaison avec la France (in English: The Mameluke Military Aristocracy after the Public Register of Ibn al-Ji'an: Elements of Comparison with France). Her academic research focuses on African intellectual history and Islamic gender studies. Became a professor in 2010.

Awards and distinctions
 Fulbright Scholarship, Michigan State University
 Rockefeller Foundation award, for research at the Bellagio Center in Italy.
 Chevalier de la Légion d'Honneur Francaise (Knight of the French Legion of Honor) 2003
 Commandeur de l'Ordre National du Mérite, France, 1999.
 Honorary doctor at the University of Uppsala in January 2005.

See also

Women in Senegal
Gender Studies

References

Bibliography
 Lydia Polgreen, "At Africa's Crumbling Colleges, No Room for Students", The New York Times, 26 mai 2007 (the situation at l'UCAD)
 Fabrice Hervieu-Wane, "Penda Mbow. Femme d'utilité publique", dans Dakar l'insoumise, Éditions Autrement, Paris, 2008, p. 94-99
 Penda Mbow, editor. "Hommes et femmes entre spheres publique et privee."Codesria, 2005

External links
  "Evolving role for Senegalese women in religion", by Penda Mbow, 2009.
 Biographie et bibliographie sur le site de l'UCAD
 « Penda Mbow – Professeur d’Histoire à l’UCAD: Au commencement, une pénurie d’eau... » (interview)
   Official Website of Mouvement Citoyen

1955 births
Living people
Senegalese politicians
Senegalese historians
Senegalese women writers
Academic staff of Cheikh Anta Diop University
Women historians
Culture ministers of Senegal